Bayramoğlu is a Turkish surname. Notable people with the surname include:

Ali Bayramoğlu (born 1956), Turkish writer and political commentator
Onur Bayramoğlu (born 1990), Turkish footballer

Turkish-language surnames
Patronymic surnames
Surnames from given names